Macna leitimorensis is a species of snout moth in the genus Macna. It was described by Pagenstecher in 1884. It is found on Ambon Island.

References

Moths described in 1884
Pyralini